Benoît Bourque is a Canadian politician, who was elected to the Legislative Assembly of New Brunswick in the 2014 provincial election. He represents the electoral district of Kent South as a member of the Liberal Party.

Bourque was named Chairman of the Select Committee on Cannabis, pursuant to Motion 31 of the 3rd session of the 58th New Brunswick Legislature.

Bourque was re-elected in the 2018 and 2020 provincial elections.

References

Living people
Health ministers of New Brunswick
Members of the Executive Council of New Brunswick
New Brunswick Liberal Association MLAs
People from Kent County, New Brunswick
21st-century Canadian politicians
Year of birth missing (living people)